Boulder Geomagnetic Observatory (BOU) is a geomagnetic observation facility operated by the United States Geological Survey (USGS). The site was established in 1961.

Customers of the observatory include the Space Weather Prediction Center (SWPC) and the Air Force Weather Agency (AFWA).

Instruments
 A magnetometer
 A solar proton sensor

See also
 Space weather
 Heliophysics
 K-index

External links
 Boulder (BOU) Geomagnetic Observatory website
 Boulder USGS Magnetometer Monitor

Geophysical observatories
Space weather